Kasthuri Nivasa( Kasthuri's House) was an Indian Kannada soap opera which premiered on 9 September 2019 and ended on 13 August 2022 in Udaya TV starring Risha Nijaguna and Dileep Shetty in lead roles.

Plot
Parvathi and Mahanadhi's youngest son Raghav marries Mridula, his estranged aunt Kasthuri's daughter. In a cruel twist of fate Mridula's sudden death plunges Raghav into desolation. Unaware of his conniving sister Sarvamangala, can Raghav infuse joy back into Kasturi Nivasa when Kushi enters his life like a breath of fresh airless is what the story unfolds.

Cast

Main
Varsha / Amrutha Ramamoorthy as Mridula Raghav
Risha Nijaguna as Kushi Raghav
Dileep Shetty as Raghav Mahanadi

Supporting
Asha Rani as Parvathi Mahanadi
Sitara as Sarvamangala Gopinath
Jyothi Rai / Nandini Gowda as Kasthuri 
Rakesh Chandru as Vasishta
Rajgopal Joshi as Mahanadi
Shilpa Iyer / Varshitha Seni / Sangeetha Narayan as Nagaveni Madhav
Ruthu Sai as Sathyabhama Keshav 
Suved Das as Abhay Gopinath
Sourav / Viyan Shikhar as Madhav Mahanadi
Padma Vasanthi as Lakkima
Jyothi as Dr. Jayamma
Jai Jagadish as Uday Narayan

Cameo appearances
Ajay Rao as himself 
Sudha Rani as herself (Mahasangama with Sevanthi)
Srinivasa Murthy as Brahmachari
Amrutha Ramamoorthy as Mridula Raghav
Jayashree S Raj as Durga

Crossover and Special episodes
It aired a one-hour special episode from 13 January 2020 to 18 January 2020 and from 22 February 2021 to 1 March 2021.
From 7 September 2020 to 11 September 2020 and from 2 November 2020 to 8 November 2020 it had a Mahasangama with Sevanthi.
It had a one-hour episode aired on 1 August 2021.

Adaptations

References

2019 Indian television series debuts
Udaya TV original programming
Kannada-language television shows